The 1984 Tanduay Rhum Makers season was the 10th season of the franchise in the Philippine Basketball Association (PBA).

Transactions

Occurrences
During the quarterfinal series against Gilbey's in the second conference, Orly Castelo, the San Sebastian College (SSC) coach in the NCAA, took over the team temporarily when regular coach Sonny Reyes had to leave on an important two-week business trip to Tokyo, Castelo steered Tanduay in the semifinal round by winning over the Gin Tonics.

Scoring record
October 30: Game 2 of the battle for third place between Tanduay and Northern Consolidated (NCC), rookie Dennis Abbatuan scored a personal-high 51 points in the Rhum Makers' 127–95 victory over NCC for a 2–0 lead in their best-of-five series for third.

Won-loss records vs Opponents

Roster

Trades

References

Tanduay
Tanduay Rhum Masters seasons